Ällitälli is a Finnish television series. It first aired on Yle TV1 in 1971 and last aired in 1972.

Cast
Heikki Kinnunen
Leo Lastumäki
Olavi Ahonen
Pirjo Viitanen

See also
List of Finnish television series

External links
 

Finnish television shows
1970s Finnish television series
1971 Finnish television series debuts
1972 Finnish television series endings
Yle original programming